Metalobosia elis is a moth of the subfamily Arctiinae. It was described by Herbert Druce in 1885. It is found in Guatemala and the Brazilian states of São Paulo and Paraná.

References

Lithosiini
Moths described in 1885